A gallop is a gait of a horse or other equine animal, or a bounding gait of any 4-legged animal.

Gallop may also refer to:

People
Angela Gallop (born 1950), British forensic scientist
Annabel Gallop (born 1961), British scholar and curator
Armando Gallop (1970-1996), American house-music producer and DJ
Cindy Gallop (born 1960), English CEO and advertising executive
Clive Gallop (1892-1960), British engineer, racing driver, and military pilot
Dave Gallop (born 1937), New Zealand cricketer and administrator
David Gallop (born 1965), Australian sports administrator and lawyer
Derek Gallop (born 1951), English former cricketer
Frank Gallop (1900–1988), American radio and television personality
Geoff Gallop (born 1951), Australian academic and former politician
George Gallop (1590–1650), English politician and Member of Parliament
Harold Gallop (1910-2006), Canadian middle-distance runner
Henry Gallop (1857-1940), English cricketer
Jane Gallop (born 1952), American professor
Matt Gallop (born 1987), New Zealand professional bowler
Richard Gallop (1808–1899), early Australian settler
Sammy Gallop (1915–1971), American lyricist
Shari Gallop, New Zealand marine environmental scientist
Tom Gallop, American actor

Arts and entertainment
Heavy metal gallop, a metal drum beat typically using a double kick pedal
Gallop (studio), a Japanese animation studio
The Japanese name for the Pokémon Rapidash

Other uses
Operation Gallop, a World War II Soviet Army operation in 1943
Gallop Hill, a mountain in the Catskill Mountains of New York, United States
Gallop Botanic Reserve, Cooktown, Shire of Cook, Queensland, Australia
Gallops (band), an experimental rock band from Wales
Gallops Island, Boston harbor, Massachusetts, United States

See also
Conductor gallop, wind-induced low frequency oscillation of overhead transmission lines
Gallop, Johnson & Neuman, L.C., the St. Louis-based law firm
Galop, lively country dance, and music composed for such entertainment
Gallup (disambiguation)
Gallup (surname)